This is a list of members of the Senate of Canada in the 32nd Parliament of Canada.

The province of Quebec has 24 Senate divisions which are constitutionally mandated. In all other provinces, a Senate division is strictly an optional designation of the senator's own choosing, and has no real constitutional or legal standing. A senator who does not choose a special senate division is designated a senator for the province at large.

Names in bold indicate senators in the 22nd or 23rd Canadian Ministry.

List of senators

Senators at the beginning of the 32nd Parliament

Senators appointed during the 32nd Parliament

Left Senate during the 32nd Parliament

Changes in party affiliation during the 32nd Parliament

See also
List of current Canadian senators

References

32
Canadian parliaments
32nd Canadian Parliament